Theodore Hesburgh Library is the primary building of the University of Notre Dame's library system. The present-day building opened on September 18, 1963, as Memorial Library. In 1987, it was renamed Hesburgh Library, in honor of Rev. Theodore Hesburgh, C.S.C., who served as the university's president from 1952 to 1987. The library's exterior façade that faces the university's football stadium includes a large,  by  mural called The Word of Life, or more commonly known as Touchdown Jesus. As of 2009, the library ranked as the 61st largest collection among research universities in the United States, with an estimated 3.39 million volumes.

History

Early libraries
Before the establishment of a library for students, students took the initiative to establish literary societies, that served as the source of literature and discussion of scholarly topics. The first one was the St. Aloysius Literary Society, which was founded in 1850 and six years later established the first student library. It was followed by the Aloysius Philodemics, the Philopatrians and the St Edwards Library Society.

The first circulating library at Notre Dame was created in 1873, by President Rev. Augustus Lemonnier, and incorporate the previously existing student libraries. It was housed on the third floor of the Main Building and its first librarian was Jimmie Edwards, CSC. In 1879 the Main Building was destroyed by fire and 500 books were lost. After the Main Building was rebuilt, a new library was established with a budget of $500 and comprised 16,000 volumes. In 1888, during the golden jubilee of Fr. Edward Sorin, a new library was opened on the third floor. By 1900, it contained 52,000 books. In 1907 the university hired Florence Espy, a professional librarian, to catalog the collection. After the death of Edwards, Paul Foik, came to Notre Dame in 1912, and took over his positions; he pushed for the construction of a library building.

A new building (the present-day Bond Hall) to house the library was built in 1917 and was dedicated during the 75th anniversary. By 1920, its collection reached 103,000 volumes. The Dewey Decimal Classification has been used to classify the library's holdings, since 1929. Thematic collections were established in other buildings in subsequent decades. A separate engineering library opened in 1933, followed by a biology library in 1938, the Medieval Institute in 1946, and the Nieuwland science library for chemistry, physics, and mathematics in 1953.

Current library
As president of the university, Father Theodore Hesburgh was focused on raising the academic profile of the institution, which so far had been heavily reliant mostly on its athletic fame. The Hesburgh administration launched a series of grand fundraising campaigns beginning, the first of which was the 1958 "Program for the Future", aimed to raise $66.6 million over ten years. Among its top priorities were two graduate residence halls,  money for student aid, and faculty and administration development. The highest priority was the new library to supplant the old and small library, which Hesburgh believed to be out of date and no longer adequate for the academic goals of the university. The campaign was greatly helped by a 6 million dollar grant from the Ford Foundation.

In 1959, Father Theodore Hesburgh announced plans for construction of a new library, which he believed to be the necessary next step towards greater academic achievement. The announcement and subsequent fundraising campaigns placed emphasis that the new library would be on par with the nation's top universities by number of books and resources and would play a role in raising the profile Notre Dame among the great American universities.

Initially, it was considered to place the new library in the place of the Main Building, either by demolishing it or by converting the structure into a library. Several plans features the destruction of the Main Building with the exception of the golden dome and the statue atop of it, which would be integrated into the new modern library building. Eventually, the unfeasibility of these designs and the opposition of alumni to the destruction of the golden dome and main building forced the administration to look for a different location. Eventually, in June 1960, it was decided to place it on the eastern edge of campus, with the understanding that this was the direction that the university was expanding in. This necessitated the destruction of a gymnasium and of Vetville, which housed married graduate students.

Ground was broken in 1961, with the Ellerbe Company of Saint Paul, Minnesota, as the project's architect. Construction took three years. Memorial Library officially opened on September 18, 1963.

The interior of  has two lower floors that serve as a base for a narrower and nearly windowless 13-story tower capped with a smaller penthouse. Interior floors have few walls and are supported by bare columns to create a flexible space to arrange stacks of books. The size of the windows was minimized to reduce glare and avoid uneven light from the outside. The two lower floors feature a more extensive use of glass, as well as brick and tweed granite, while the upper floors are finished in Makato stone.

The library's collection reached one million volumes in 1970 and surpassed 1.5 million volumes in 1986. In 1987 the library was renamed Hesburgh Library in honor of Fr. Hesburgh, the university's retiring president, who served as Notre Dame's president for thirty-five years (1952–1987). In his retirement, Hesburgh maintained an office on the library's thirteenth floor, overlooking the Main Quad.

As of 2009, the library housed 3.39 million volumes. The Association of Research Libraries ranked it the 61st largest collection among research universities in the United States.

In 2015, the university began major renovations to the library that will modernize its interior design.

Word of Life/Touchdown Jesus mural

History
The idea of a mural on the facade had been conceived early, in part for the need to decorate the large structure which otherwise would have seem dull and resembled a large grain silo. Hesburgh was also inspired by the mosaic murals of the Central Library at the National Autonomous University of Mexico in Mexico City, which he had visited in April 1955.

When the library opened in 1963, the mural had not yet been installed. American artist Millard Sheets was commissioned to create a work large enough to cover the entire side of the library facing Notre Dame's football stadium. Fr. Theodore Hesburgh suggested that the theme should be saints and scholars through the ages. The artwork cost $200,000 and was donated by Mr. and Mrs. Howard V. Phalin of Winnetka, Illinois. Installation took place in the spring of 1964; the dedication ceremony was held on May 7, 1964. The mural is composed of 324 panels. It consists of 81 different stones from 16 countries in 171 finishes that includes 46 granites and syenites, 10 gabbros and labradorites, 4 metamorphic gneisses, 12 serpentines, 4 crystalline marbles, and 5 limestones.

Description
The artwork depicts a procession of figures representing Christian saints, thinkers, teachers, and writers, a topic that connected to the idea of the library. Figures were selected from different centuries and places to convey the concept of the Catholic Church's historical continuity. At the top of the procession the central figure is the resurrected Jesus Christ, conceived as the great teacher and master, and the fountain of knowledge contained in the library.

Nickname
The mural's image of Jesus, visible from Notre Dame's football stadium, has arms raised in the same fashion as a referee signifying a touchdown. From this similarity came the mural's nickname, Touchdown Jesus. A stadium expansion partially obscures views of the mural from the field.

Notes

References

Further reading
 Stevenson, Marsha. "Style and Symbol: Library Buildings at Notre Dame." In

External links

 
 Hesburgh Library 50th Anniversary

1963 establishments in Indiana
Academic libraries
Libraries in Indiana
Library buildings completed in 1963
University and college academic libraries in the United States
University and college buildings completed in 1963
University of Notre Dame buildings and structures